Camptophallus botti is a species of crab in the family Pseudothelphusidae, and the only species in the genus Camptophallus. It is endemic to the Nicaraguan departments of Matagalpa and Jinotega.

References

Pseudothelphusidae
Endemic fauna of Nicaragua
Arthropods of Central America
Monotypic decapod genera